Kylie Fausto Verzosa (born February 7, 1992) is a Filipino actress, model, and beauty queen who was crowned Binibining Pilipinas International 2016 and Miss International 2016. She is the sixth Filipina to win the Miss International crown.

Early life and education
Kylie Fausto Verzosa was born in Baguio, Philippines, to Filipino parents Ari and Racquel Verzosa. She graduated high school from Saint Louis University and she graduated from Ateneo de Manila University with a bachelor's degree in Business Management. She worked as a pre-school teacher at one point. She is an advocate of mental health, depression, and suicide awareness. Verzosa volunteered for the Natasha Goulbourn Foundation, which aims to educate people about depression and suicide. She later on created Mental Health Matters, an online support group which aims to give emotional support to people who are experiencing depression, anxiety disorder, and other forms of mental illnesses. She was also a member of the Professional Models Association of the Philippines. She has done ramp and print modeling.

Pageantry

Binibining Pilipinas
Verzosa first participated at the Binibining Pilipinas 2015, where she placed in the top 15. She joined Binibining Pilipinas once again and was crowned Binibining Pilipinas International 2016 on April 17, 2016 at the Smart Araneta Coliseum, Quezon City, Philippines. With this, she represented the Philippines at the Miss International 2016 pageant in Tokyo, Japan.

Miss International 2016
Verzosa represented the Philippines at Miss International 2016 in Japan where she was eventually crowned as Miss International 2016 by Edymar Martínez of  Venezuela. She is the 6th Miss International Winner from the Philippines.

During the speech portion of the pageant, the girls were given a chance to express their plans if crowned Miss International and share their personal advocacies. Verzosa's speech read:

After the coronation, Verzosa and her court had some final things to do with the sponsors of the Miss International Organization such as Miss Paris' beauty school and Mikimoto pearl farm in Japan. Also, Miss International 2016 visited Toba International Hotel and Unicef where she met the National Directors of UNICEF in Denmark and Japan. Verzosa and her court also visited the Org's sponsor, Ash Salon in Yokohama before flying to Ishigaki. During their trip to Ishigaki, they were able to meet the local weavers and claypot makers of the island and have a parade.

Several days after the Miss International Activities in Japan, Verzosa flew back to the Philippines wherein she had a media tour from all the biggest networks in the country and shared her experience in the competition and discussed her advocacy. On November 18, the Binibining Pilipinas Charities Incorporated together with the People of the Philippines threw a grand homecoming parade in Metro Manila for the newly crowned Filipina. She was also given a festive welcome parade in her hometown in Baguio and visited some colleges and universities where she discussed her advocacy. On December 5, she had a courtesy call from the President of the Philippines and formally met President Rodrigo Duterte.

On January 3, Miss Paris' advertorial was displayed in Shibuya Station in Japan. That year, Kylie was named as one of the People of the Year by the People Asia Magazine and asked to speak at the Philippine Psychiatric Association. Kylie also became an ambassador for Samsung and was featured in some magazines such as Shape and StarStyle.

On February 8, Kylie flew to Singapore for her first international trip and Miss International duties to spread awareness on her advocacy. She visited Lee Kuan Yew School of Public Policy and Institute of Mental Health/Woodbridge Hospital. In the same month, Kylie went to Maguindanao and Bacolod to host an event. Together with the reigning Miss Earth 2016, Katherine Espin of Ecuador, Kylie went to Ilocos Sur for some promotional activities of a resort. As a product of Baguio, she was again invited for the Panagbenga Flower Festival 2017 and posed on the float of Tropicana. Versoza became the newest ambassador of Star Cruise Asia together with Male Top Model, LA Aguinaldo. She also posed in the cover of SM Shop Mag.

Kylie also announced on the first day of March that she is the newest face/endorser of one of the Philippine brand Bayo. In celebration of Bayo's 25 years in the industry, they collaborated with fashion designer Francis Libiran (also the designer of Kylie's gown in the Miss International competition and some events). On March 4, Kylie went back to Japan to continue some Miss International duties. She went to Kyoto, Tokyo and Tokushima. During her visit in Tokushima, Kylie was able to support its local produce fruits such as strawberries. She was also able to visit Tokushima Commercial Highschool which is known for their outreach and exchange program with Cambodia. The reigning queen was also featured in a local Japanese newspaper. Before flying back to the Philippines, Kylie had a tour at the Naruto River together with the head of MIO. During the same month, Kylie announced her participation in Philippines' Next Top Model as a Model Mentor. March was also the month in which she was featured on the cover of Style Weekend.

On April 5, Kylie became the newest endorser of Wilkins Delight together with Mateo Guidicelli for their new product. Kylie was invited on April 7 to speak about mental health for the United Nations by the World Health Organization. The next day, Kylie was also invited to speak in Miriam College for TEDxMiriamCollege. During the Holy Week vacation, Kylie travelled to Brunei to visit preschoolers in Bandar Seri Begawan. Kylie also received some endorsements / invitations such as for DrCRB Aesthetic and Laser Clinic. On the last day of the month Kylie crowned the newest Binibining Pilipinas International 2017.

In May, Kylie was invited to the Senate of the Philippines for the final reading of the Mental Health Bill in the Archipelago. She also went to the presscon for the passing of the Mental Health Bill. During the month, Kylie was featured in the cover of Fair and Mega magazines and promoted business such as Havaianas Philippines.

In September, she was invited to the coronation night of Reinas de Belleza del Paraguay 2017 where she crowned one of the winners as the new Miss International Paraguay, the event was held in the border city of Ciudad del Este, so she had a chance to visit the Iguazu Falls in neighbor Brazil too.

On November 14, 2017, she crowned her successor Kevin Lilliana Junaedy from Indonesia as Miss International 2017 in Tokyo, Japan. She finished her reign at 1 year, 2 weeks, and 4 days.

Personal life 
Kylie Verzosa co-manages the Philippine operations of the Japanese-funded real estate start-up PropertyAccess.

Verzosa recently starred in her first major film, The Housemaid, a Filipino adaptation of a Korean movie with the same name. She acted alongside Albert Martinez and several veteran actors.

Filmography

Television

Digital series

Movies

References

External links

1992 births
Living people
Binibining Pilipinas winners
Filipino female models
People from Baguio
Ateneo de Manila University alumni
Filipino schoolteachers
Miss International winners
Miss International 2016 delegates
21st-century Filipino educators
Viva Artists Agency